Richard Holmes (born 7 November 1980) is a former footballer who played in The Football League for Notts County. He also had a loan spell at Hereford United in the Conference National. Holmes grew up in Bottesford, Leicestershire.

References

 

English footballers
Notts County F.C. players
Hereford United F.C. players
English Football League players
1980 births
Living people
People from Bottesford, Leicestershire
Footballers from Leicestershire
Association football defenders